Paul Mounet (5 October 1847 – 10 February 1922), born Jean-Paul Sully, was a French actor.

Biography 

The younger brother of actor Jean Mounet-Sully, Paul was born in Bergerac, Dordogne, and studied to become a medical doctor prior to his career in acting, only making his debut in 1880 in Paris Odéon's production of Horace. It was in 1889 that he first played at the Comédie Française, of which he became sociétaire two years later. Mounet garnered acclaim for his roles in Les Érinnyes, L'Arlésienne, Othello, Patrie, Hamlet, La Furie, Anthony, Le Roi, L'Enigme, Le Dédale, and Œdipe Roi.

Mounet appeared in a number of films, including playing the title character in a 1909 silent black-and-white version of Macbeth, directed by acclaimed French director André Calmettes.

He served as a professor at the Paris Conservatoire, teaching, among others, Pierre Fresnay, Valentine Tessier, Hélène Dieudonné, Daniel Mendaille, Françoise Rosay, and Marioara Ventura and became a Chevalier in the Legion of Honour.

Mounet died of heart disease on February 10, 1922.

Filmography 

 1909: Rigoletto
 1909: Macbeth as Macbeth
 1909: The Return of Ulysses as Ulysses
 1910: L'Héritière as Louis XI
 1912: Les Jacobites
 1917: Par la vérité

Theater 
 1909: La Furie by Jules Bois, Comédie-Française  
 1913: Yvonic by Paul Ferrier and Jeanne Ferrier, Comédie-Française
 1920: Romeo and Juliet by William Shakespeare, Comédie-Française

References

External links
 

1847 births
1922 deaths
People from Bergerac, Dordogne
French male stage actors
French male film actors
French male silent film actors
20th-century French male actors
Chevaliers of the Légion d'honneur
Sociétaires of the Comédie-Française